Marinne Giraud (born 23 April 1986) is a Mauritian former professional tennis player.

She has a career-high singles ranking by the Women's Tennis Association (WTA) of 237, achieved on 15 December 2008, and a career-high WTA doubles ranking of 291, reached on 12 May 2008, making her the No. 1 Mauritian female tennis player.

Giraud first played for Mauritius Fed Cup team in 2007, she has a career win–loss record of 9–6.

Her year-end WTA rankings are as follows: 817th (2004), 618th (2005), 591st (2006), 293rd (2007) and 288th (2008).

ITF Circuit finals

Singles: 5 (4–1)

Doubles 4 (3–1)

Fed Cup

Singles: 8 (6 wins, 2 losses)

Doubles: 7 (3 wins, 4 losses)

References

External links
 
 
 

1986 births
Living people
Mauritian tennis players
Mauritian female tennis players
People from Plaines Wilhems District
Mauritian people of French descent